Cecile of France (1097 – 1145) was a daughter of Philip I of France and Bertrade de Montfort.

Marriages
Her first marriage was arranged while Bohemond I of Antioch was visiting the French court seeking support against Alexios I Komnenos. She sailed for Antioch at the end of 1106 and became Lady of Tarsus and Mamistra, in Cilician Armenia. Cecile married firstly (late 1106) Tancred, Prince of Galilee, Regent of Antioch, who succeeded in 1111 as Prince of Antioch.

While dying in 1112, Tancred made Pons of Tripoli promise to marry her, and Tancred gave her the fortresses of Arcicanum and Rugia as a dowry. They married in 1112. In 1133, Pons was besieged at his castle of Montferrand by Imad ad-Din Zengi, atabeg of Mosul, and Cecile appealed to her half-brother Fulk, King of Jerusalem, to come to his aid. Zengi abandoned the siege, but during a second siege in 1137, Pons was captured and killed. He was succeeded by his son with Cecile, Raymond II. Cecile died in 1145.

Children with Pons
Raymond II, Count of Tripoli
 Philip 
 Agnes, wife of Renaud II, Lord of Margat

References

Sources

1097 births
12th-century deaths
House of Capet
French princesses
Countesses of Tripoli
11th-century French people
11th-century French women
12th-century French people
12th-century French women
Daughters of kings